Kotha may refer to several places:

 Kotha, Jalandhar, Punjab, India
 Kotha, Khyber Pakhtunkhwa, Pakistan
 Kotha, Punjab, India

See also
 Kota (disambiguation)